Rex Bookstore, Inc. (RBSI) is an educational book publisher and bookstore chain in the Philippines. It was incorporated in 1950 and established branches in the provincial cities of Angeles City, Bacolod, Baguio, Basco, Cabanatuan, Cagayan de Oro, Calapan, Cebu City, Dasmariñas, Davao City, General Santos, Iloilo City, Legazpi, Naga, Tacloban, Tuguegarao, Urdaneta, and Zamboanga City.

It is one of the pioneers in the educational publishing industry in the Philippines. It has books for all levels from basic education (pre-elementary, elementary, and high school), tertiary, law, professional books, references, and children's books.

RBSI also publishes Teacher's Manuals, along with interactive materials like activity posters, charts, and other paper-based materials. The company also develops audio CDs for some of its books.

The latest addition to its products is the online book support materials that teachers and learners can get from its website.

References

Bookstores of the Philippines
Companies based in Quezon City
Book publishing companies of the Philippines
Retail companies established in 1950